HMS Charger was a  which served with the Royal Navy. She was launched by Yarrow Shipbuilders at Poplar, London on 15 September 1894, served in home waters and was sold off in 1912.

Construction and design
On 12 October 1893, the British Admiralty placed an order for three torpedo boat destroyers (Charger,  and ) with the shipbuilder Yarrow under the 1893–1894 shipbuilding programme for the Royal Navy as a follow-on to the two prototype destroyers ( and ) ordered from Yarrows under the 1892–1893 programme.

As a torpedo boat, the planned armament was a single QF 12 pounder 12 cwt ( calibre) gun on a platform on the ship's conning tower (in practice the platform was also used as the ship's bridge), together with a secondary gun armament of three 6-pounder guns, and two 18 inch (450 mm) torpedo tubes. As a gunboat, one of the torpedo tubes could be removed to accommodate a further two six-pounders.

Displacement was  light and  full load. Two funnels were fitted.

Charger was laid down at Yarrow's Poplar, London shipyard in November 1893 as Yard number 991 and was launched on 15 September 1894. She reached a speed of  during sea trials, and was completed in January 1896, at a cost of £41,133. Locomotive boilers were being made obsolete by water-tube boilers by the time of her completion, and she was refitted at Earle's Shipbuilding in 1899–1890 with water-tube boilers changing to a three-funneled configuration.

Service history
In 1896 Charger was in reserve at Portsmouth. In July 1901, she took part in that year's Naval Manoeuvres. Charger was commissioned at Devonport by Lieutenant Robert William Francis Travers on 11 March 1902, for service with the Devonport instructional flotilla. Travers was reassigned to the battleship  the following month, when Lieutenant G. H. Brown was appointed in command of Charger. She took part in the fleet review held at Spithead on 16 August 1902 for the coronation of King Edward VII. On 23 September 1903, Charger struck rocks in Loch Nevis on the West coast of Scotland.

In July 1905, Charger, as part of the Chatham Reserve Squadron, took part in fleet exercises in the English Channel. Charger was refitted at Sheerness dockyard in 1908, having her boilers re-tubed, although the refit was interrupted on 27 April when the destroyer  was badly damaged in a collision with the cruiser , with Charger having to vacate her dock to accommodate Ribble. Charger, now part of the Sixth Destroyer Flotilla, was again refitted at Sheerness in August 1911.

Charger was sold at Chatham to the shipbreaker Ward on 14 May 1912 for scrapping at their Silvertown works, at a price of £1600.

Notes

Citations

Bibliography
 
 

 

Charger-class destroyers
Ships built in Poplar
1894 ships
A-class destroyers (1913)